South Street–South Church Street Historic District is a national historic district located at Union, Union County, South Carolina.  The district encompasses 78 contributing buildings in a primarily residential section of Union.  The houses were built between about 1850 to about 1930, with the majority dating from about 1850 to about 1915. The district includes many large-frame Queen Anne inspired houses built about 1880–1910. Also in the district are Neo-Classical, Gothic Revival, Colonial Revival, Tudor Revival, American Foursquare, and Bungalow style dwellings. The district includes the first Carnegie Library established in South Carolina.

It was added to the National Register of Historic Places in 1983, with a boundary increase in 1989.

References

External links

Historic American Buildings Survey in South Carolina
Houses on the National Register of Historic Places in South Carolina
Historic districts on the National Register of Historic Places in South Carolina
Queen Anne architecture in South Carolina
Colonial Revival architecture in South Carolina
Neoclassical architecture in South Carolina
Gothic Revival architecture in South Carolina
Tudor Revival architecture in South Carolina
Houses in Union County, South Carolina
National Register of Historic Places in Union County, South Carolina